is an action-adventure game developed and published by Nippon Ichi Software. It was released in Japan in May 2018 for Nintendo Switch, PlayStation 4, and PlayStation Vita, and was released in western territories in February 2019 only for Switch and PlayStation 4. iOS and Android mobile ports were released in Japan in May 2020.

Gameplay
The Liar Princess and the Blind Prince is an action-adventure game played from a side-scrolling perspective. The player is a wolf who can freely shapeshift into a princess under most circumstances and must do so to properly escort the prince through the levels. In princess form, the player can hold hands with the prince in order to bring him alongside her and give him simple instructions to perform, such as jumping or telling him to walk left or right for a way. However, the princess is also more vulnerable as she cannot survive falls from high areas and attacks from creatures. In wolf form, the player is able to protect the prince from the forest creatures and human enemies in combat, either by directly attacking the creatures or by utilizing the environment in order to do so. The wolf can also survive high falls and withstand attacks from creatures. There are also environmental puzzles in the forest, such as platforms that react to weight, small areas that only the princess can fit through, or heavy objects that block the road and can only be broken by the strength of the wolf. The prince can also hold and place certain objects for the princess while the player guides him to the right position. There are several objects that only the prince can hold, such as fire lanterns.

Plot
Every night, on a tall cliff deep within a monster-filled forest, a large wolf monster would sing to the night sky. Her beautiful voice soon attracted the attention of a young prince from the kingdom surrounded by the forest, who began to journey to the forest every night to listen to her. Initially wary of the human, the Wolf began to enjoy the prince's admiration for her music, but feared letting the prince discover what she truly was and would run off before he could see her. One night, the Prince climbed up the cliff to see the owner of the lovely voice and the Wolf, caught off guard by the prince's actions, accidentally blinded him when she impulsively tried to cover his eyes. In fear, the prince stumbled backwards and fell off the cliff despite the Wolf's attempts to rescue him. After being saved by a guard, drawn over by the commotion, the Prince is imprisoned by his parents as his wound shamed their family. 

A few days later, the wolf sneaked into the castle upon learning of this and feeling guilty over the prince's misfortune. Telling the prince that she is a princess from a neighboring kingdom, the Wolf decides to take the prince to visit the Witch of the Forest; a mystical being who can grant wishes for a price. But realizing she cannot take him as she is, the Wolf seeks out the Witch and offers her singing voice for human form. The Witch accepts, giving the Wolf the ability to freely transform into a princess yet warned her that the spell would be negated under moonlight. Returning to the castle and freeing the Prince, the Wolf (assuming the form of the Princess) begins her long quest to guide him to the Witch in order to wish for his eyes to be healed. 

Over the course of the journey, the two begin to bond, though the "Princess's" unusual mannerisms arouse confusion and eventually suspicion from the Prince. One night, while the Princess was handing the Prince a flower, a moonbeam cast over her hand and returned it to its original form. The Prince, remembering the feel of the arm that blinded him, immediately recognized it and the resulting falling out caused a massive forest fire. The flames eventually reach and consume most of the Witch's collection; the payments of all the wishes she had granted. Infuriated, the Witch transforms into a massive monster and begins to rampage through the forest. After saving the Prince from the fire, the Princess and Prince decide to work together to calm the Witch down in order to apologize. They succeed and though she is still furious with them, the Witch accepts the Princess's request for the Prince's eyesight restored, though both her ability to transform and her memories of the Prince would be required as payment. The Witch admits that such a price would not normally be required to heal the Prince's eyes alone, but to atone for their sins and to acquire the power needed to heal the forest, she would need the additional magic. Despite the Prince's attempting to stop the Princess from accepting the terms, he is powerless to prevent it as the Princess is permanently turned back into her true form.

Sometime after, though now a horrible singer, the Wolf continued singing on a cliff to the night sky until the Prince (still calling her a princess) appears one night. Having forgotten who he is, the Wolf initially attempts to eat him. Before she can do so, the Prince gives her a bouquet of flowers, causing the Wolf to be overwhelmed by emotions of nostalgia and sorrow. No longer feeling alone, the two sit down next to each other. Despite her lost memories and voice, the Wolf enjoys the Prince's company and continues singing for him from that point on.

Development
The idea behind The Liar Princess and the Blind Prince came from a web designer during an internal pitching contest within Nippon Ichi Software. Such contests are held annually at the company and earlier editions resulted in the development of games such as htoL#NiQ: The Firefly Diary and Yomawari: Night Alone. The game was revealed in January 2018 during a live-broadcast video presentation.

In August 2018, NIS America announced they were publishing the game in North America and Europe in 2019, only for the Nintendo Switch and PlayStation 4. NIS America also released a limited physical edition that includes a special book and physical copy of the soundtrack.

References

External links

2018 video games
Action-adventure games
Nippon Ichi Software games
Nintendo Switch games
PlayStation 4 games
PlayStation Vita games
Video games developed in Japan
Video games featuring female protagonists
Video games set in castles
Single-player video games
Liar
Android (operating system) games
iOS games